Aukrug is a municipality in the district of Rendsburg-Eckernförde, in Schleswig-Holstein, Germany. It is situated approximately 13 km west of Neumünster, and 35 km southwest of Kiel.

Geography
Aukrug is the seat of the Amt (collective municipality) of Aukrug.

Aukrug is south of the municipality of Mörel or Gnutz, east of Hohenwestedt and west of Wasbek and Ehndorf.

History
Innien, the oldest part of the municipality, appears in a surviving record from as far back as 1128.   The name Aukrug comes from ‘in de Aukrögen’, using the Plattdeutsch (low German) of the region, and means something along the lines of ‘in the folds of the flood plain’.

Tönsheide Forest 
It consists of large areas of near-natural woodland with scattered areas of heath.

See also
Aukrug Nature Park

References

External links

 
Rendsburg-Eckernförde